Setia Ku Di Sini is the third studio album from Malaysian pop singer Ziana Zain which was released in 1996. The album won Best Female Vocal in an Album in 1996's Anugerah Industri Muzik.

Track listing
 "Tiada Kepastian" (Johari Teh) – 3:44
 "Sangkar Cinta" (Idzahar, Azam Dungun) – 5:08
 "Kemelut Di Muara Kasih"  (Saari Amri, Lukhman S.) – 5:14
 "Antara Ikhlas Dan Paksa" (Jay Jay, Usop) – 4:22
 "Tuduhan" (Zuriani, Nuar) – 4:26
 "Kini Ku Mengerti" (Zul Nadzhar, Johan Aziz) – 3:47
 "Rantaian Kasih" (X.Boy, Rosli Ali) – 3:36
 "Bersama Akhirnya" (Johari Teh) – 5:03
 "Kehadiran Mu" (Hussain Anuar, Salman) – 5:32
 "Setia Ku Di Sini" (Salman, Nurbisa II) – 5:05

Awards

Certification

Personnel
 Executive producer: Johari Teh
 Mastering: Ramli MS, Johari Teh, Adnan Abu Hassan, Azlan Abu Hassan, Helen Yap, Fauzi Marzuki
 Concept & A&R: Johari Teh
 Coordinator A & R: Edrie Hashim
 Promotion management: Samirah, Rohani, Rina, Sharum, Nan Dengkil, Freda Hassan (Singapura)
 Recording studio: Synchrosound Studio, GrooveWorks Studio, WizardWorks Production
 Mastering: Fauzi Marzuki @ Sonic Mastering Lab
 Album artwork: Foo @ Matchbox Studio
 Make-up: Nurul
 Clothing: Versace
 Photography: Boestamam @ Jubang Sutajio

References

External links
 Fan Site

Ziana Zain albums
1995 albums
Bertelsmann Music Group albums
Malay-language albums